Kuban Airlines served the following destinations (as of November 2012):

References

Kuban Airlines